Antonovich is a Russian language patronymic surname derived from the first name Anton.

Not to be confused with the patronymic part "Antonivich" of full East Slavic names. The confusion may arise, e.g., for the names of nobility, often not using surnames, such as Alexei Antonovich of Brunswick.

The surname may refer to:

Michael D. Antonovich
Mike Antonovich (ice hockey)
Yuri Antonovich

Related surnames
Antanovich, Belarusian
Antanavičius, Lithianian
Antonowicz, Polish
 Antonovych (name), Ukrainian

See also

Mikhail Antonevich
Antonavich

Russian-language surnames
Patronymic surnames